Janet Dhillon (née Wilcox) is an American lawyer. She is a former chair and commissioner of the Equal Employment Opportunity Commission, serving as chair from May 2019 to January 2021, and as commissioner from May 2019 to November 2022. Prior to that, Dhillon was the executive vice president, general counsel, and corporate secretary of Burlington Stores.

Early life and education 
Dhillon was born in New York and raised in California.  She earned her Bachelor of Arts degree in History from Occidental College. Dhillon attended Occidental College at the same time that future President Barack Obama was on campus, before he would transfer to Columbia University. She then earned a Juris Doctor from the UCLA School of Law.

Career 
Dhillon began her legal career at the law firm of Skadden, Arps, Slate, Meagher & Flom LLP, where she was employed from 1991 to 2004. From 2004 to 2009, she held a variety of roles at US Airways. In 2009, Dhillon became executive vice president, general counsel, and corporate secretary of J. C. Penney. She joined Burlington Stores in 2015.

Donald Trump nominated Dhillon to the Equal Employment Opportunity Commission on June 29, 2017.  She was confirmed on May 8, 2019, and became the agency's chair after being sworn in on May 15, 2019. Following the inauguration of President Joe Biden, Dhillon was replaced as chair of the EEOC by Charlotte Burrows. Although her term expired in July 2022, she remained in office until her resignation on November 18, 2022.

Personal life 
She is married to Uttam Dhillon, former acting administrator of the Drug Enforcement Administration.

References

External links 
 Biography at Burlington Stores

Living people
21st-century American lawyers
Skadden, Arps, Slate, Meagher & Flom people
Trump administration personnel
Year of birth missing (living people)
Chairs of the Equal Employment Opportunity Commission